The "Game of Three Halves" was the name given to a football match played between Sunderland and Derby County on the opening day of the 1894–95 English football season.

Derby had travelled to Sunderland on 1 September for their first round fixture in the new First Division season, but as the nominated referee, T. Kirkham, was running late, the game started with a replacement referee, John Conqueror, in charge.

After 45 minutes play, with Sunderland leading 3–0, Kirkham arrived and made the  incredible decision to ask Derby if they wanted to start the game from scratch. Derby accepted, meaning the 45 minutes that had already been played were null and void annulled. 

Two more halves followed, thus allowing three halves to be played, but the decision to start the match again did not help Derby. They conceded three further goals in the "second half" and five goals in the "third half" to officially lose the match 8–0.

References

External links
Full report of match

1894–95 in English football
Association football controversies
Football League First Division matches
Derby County F.C. matches
Sunderland A.F.C. matches
September 1894 sports events
Nicknamed sporting events